Jarne Teulings (born 11 January 2002) is a Belgian footballer who plays as a midfielder for Fortuna Sittard and the Belgium national team.

Club career
Teulings made her debut in the Belgian first division during the 2017/18 season, playing for OH Leuven. After some good performances during the 2018/19 season she subsequently signed for KRC Genk.

For the 2020/21 season she signed for Anderlecht which marked her break-through as a regular player in both the competition, as well as the national team.

After winning the 2020/21 championship with Anderlecht, Teulings signed a 2-year contract with FC Twente. However, after only 6 months, Teulings returned to Anderlecht for the remainder of the 2021/22 season.

International career
Teulings made her debut for the Belgium national team on 27 October 2020, coming on as a substitute for Janice Cayman against Lithuania.

International goals
Scores and results list Belgium's goal tally first.

References

External links
 

2002 births
Living people
Women's association football midfielders
Belgian women's footballers
Belgium women's international footballers
KRC Genk Ladies players
RSC Anderlecht (women) players
FC Twente (women) players
Super League Vrouwenvoetbal players
Eredivisie (women) players
Expatriate women's footballers in the Netherlands
Belgian expatriate women's footballers
Fortuna Sittard (women) players